The Gilles-Courteau Trophy is awarded annually by the Quebec Major Junior Hockey League to the league's playoffs champion. On February 21, 2023, the President's Cup was renamed in honor of Gilles Courteau who announced his retirement as Commissioner on December 16, 2022.

Winners

Teams that went on to win the Memorial Cup are listed in bold font.

See also
J. Ross Robertson Cup - OHL
Ed Chynoweth Cup - WHL

References

External links
 QMJHL official site List of trophy winners.

Quebec Major Junior Hockey League trophies and awards